James Herbert (24 April 1895 – 21 November 1957) was an Australian cricketer. He played five first-class matches for Western Australia between 1923/24 and 1926/27.

See also
 List of Western Australia first-class cricketers

References

External links
 

1895 births
1957 deaths
Australian cricketers
Western Australia cricketers
Cricketers from Fremantle